Madagiri is also spelled as Madigiri or Madagera is a large village in the southern state of Karnataka, Madagiri is located in the Sirwar taluk of Raichur district in Karnataka.Madagiri famous for the largest cotton growing village in the Raichur district.

History
Mandal Panchayats were functioning before Gram Panchayats came into existence in Karnataka.  Madagiri Mandal Panchayat is one of the many Mandal Panchayats in Karnataka. Madagiri, Halli Hosur, Chagabavi, Machanur, Ganadinni, Lakkadinni, Tupadur, Bommanala and Jalpur villages used to come under this Mandal Panchayat. Under the Panchayat Raj Act 1993, Madagiri Mandal Panchayat was terminated and is functioning instead as Madagiri Gram Panchayat.

Demographics 
As for the 2011 India census, Madagiri had a population of 4621 with 2332 females and 2289 males.

Important places
Sri Gundina Marutheshwara Temple
Sri Bettada Basaveshwara Temple
Sri Beeralingeshwara Temple
Sri Kalika Devi Temple
Sri Maremma Devi Temple
Mathodist Church
Jamiya Masjeed
Masjeed-E-Madeena

Other places
Grama Panchayat Office Madagiri
Post Office Madagiri
Government Sub Centre Madagiri
Government Health and Wellness Center Madagiri
Government APMC Madagiri

Schools and colleges
Government Model Higher Primary School Madagiri
Government Primary School Madagiri
Government Primary School Madagiri Camp
Jnana Jyothi Pre and Lower Primary School Madagiri
Prerana Pre and Lower Primary School Madagiri
Government High School Madagiri
Government Pre University College Madagiri

See also
 Manvi
 Raichur
 Sindhanur
 Sirwar

References

External links
 http://Raichur.nic.in

Villages in Raichur district